Estrellita is a 1947 Argentine film directed by Román Viñoly Barreto.

Cast
 Yeya Duciel
 José Olarra
 Luis Zaballa
 Ricardo Duggan
 Marcos Zucker
 Carmen Llambí
 Rafael Salzano
 Carlos Belluci
 Norma Giménez
 Diego Marcote
 María Bayardo
 Marisa Núñez ...Extra

References

External links
 

1947 films
1940s Spanish-language films
Argentine black-and-white films
Films directed by Román Viñoly Barreto
1940s Argentine films